Carpool is a 1983 made-for-television film directed by E. W. Swackhamer.

Plot
When carpools start being assigned by computer, A call center employee (Harvey Korman), a nun turned college student (Stephanie Faracy), an actor (Peter Scolari) and a boxer (TK Carter) in a carpool group come into possession of a million dollars that has fallen off an armored car.  An ex-policeman has his eyes on the loot as well and the chase is on.

References

External links

1983 television films
1983 films
American television films
Films directed by E. W. Swackhamer
1980s English-language films